Clyde North is a suburb in Melbourne, Victoria, Australia, 46 km south-east of Melbourne's Central Business District, located within the City of Casey local government area. Clyde North recorded a population of 31,681 at the 2021 census.

History

It was named after the Clyde Creek, a watercourse between two early pastoral runs. The stream flowed eastwards to the Koo Wee Rup Swamp about 6 km away. It is thought that the name was inspired by the Clyde River, Scotland.

Clyde Post Office opened on 25 January 1864. In 1915 it was renamed Clyde North, when Clyde Railway Station office was renamed Clyde.

Today

The area to the west of Berwick-Cranbourne Road is mostly within the Urban Growth Boundary, with a residential development known as "Cascades On Clyde" and several others, under construction, having begun in late 2007.

Parks Victoria are also investigating the creation of a new regional park, on land bounded by Berwick-Cranbourne and Thompson Roads.

The area of Clyde North to the east of the newly built suburban area, roughly 1 kilometre east of Berwick-Cranbourne Road, is classed as Green wedge land, is distinctly rural in nature, and is outside of the main growth corridor. The land is used in this area for a mixture of market gardening (notably around Pattersons Road) and dairy farming. The land is mainly flat, and most of the roads in the area are dirt roads maintained by the City of Casey.

A new lifestyle centre was recently opened in late 2019, with a Bunnings Warehouse as the first store, followed by a few others, and now even contains an Aldi supermarket.

Estates

Clyde North has since expanded and has many new estates. Selandra Rise which borders Cranbourne East has now been sold out and also now has a local shopping centre within the estate. Since the completion there have been a number of estates commence within the Clyde North area which have been listed below:

 Aspen on Clyde
 Berwick Waters
 Circa
 Highgrove
 Clydevale
 Thompsons Run
 The Boulevard
 Bloom
 Ramlegh Springs
 Meridian
 St Germain
 Delaray
 Northside

See also
 City of Cranbourne – Clyde North was previously within this former local government area.

References

Towns in Victoria (Australia)
Suburbs of the City of Casey